Edward Miller Carr (3 October 1917 – 1998) was an English professional footballer and manager.

Career
Born in Wheatley Hill, Carr started his career at Arsenal, joining in 1935 but he spent the first two years of his career there on loan at their nursery club, Margate. He returned to Arsenal in August 1937 and made his debut against Manchester City on 16 February 1938; he went on to score seven times in eleven games to help Arsenal win the 1937–38 title. However, he suffered a serious knee injury in a game at the start of the following season which seemingly finished his career.

During the Second World War he returned to his hometown to work at the local pit but upon the end of hostilities, he returned to playing football with Huddersfield Town. He later played for Newport County, Bradford City and Darlington, whom he later also managed.

Honours

As a player
Margate
Southern League Central Section Title winner: 1935–36
Southern League Eastern Section Title winner: 1935–36
Southern League Midweek Section Title winner: 1936–37
Kent Senior Cup winner: 1935–36, 1936–37

Arsenal
First Division: 1937-38

Managerial statistics

References

External links

1917 births
1998 deaths
People from Wheatley Hill
Footballers from County Durham
English footballers
Association football forwards
Arsenal F.C. players
Huddersfield Town A.F.C. players
Newport County A.F.C. players
Bradford City A.F.C. players
Darlington F.C. players
Huddersfield Town A.F.C. wartime guest players
English football managers
Darlington F.C. managers